Dual kingship may refer to:
a single monarch ruling two realms, see Personal union
two monarchs ruling a single realm, see Diarchy